{{Infobox song
| name       = Weary Blues from Waitin'
| cover      =
| alt        =
| published =  Acuff-Rose Publications, Inc.
| type       = single
| artist     = Hank Williams With His Drifting Cowboys
| album      =
| B-side     = I Can't Escape from You
| released   = 
| format     =
| recorded   =  demo +  overdub<ref>{{Cite web|last=Sexton|first=Paul|date=2021-07-08|title='Weary Blues From Waitin: Even In Death, Hank Williams' Reign Went On|url=https://www.udiscovermusic.com/stories/hank-williams-weary-blues-from-waitin-song/|access-date=2021-09-23|website=uDiscover Music|language=en-US}}</ref>
| studio     =
| venue      =
| genre      = Country, blues
| length     = 2:26
| label      = MGM 11574
| writer     = Hank Williams
| producer   =
| prev_title = I Won't Be Home No More
| prev_year  = 1953
| next_title = Calling You
| next_year  = 1953
}}

"Weary Blues from Waitin'" is a song written by Hank Williams.  It was released as a posthumous single on MGM Records in 1953.

Background
Although Williams had been found dead in his chauffeur-driven Cadillac on his way to a show in Canton, Ohio on New Year's Day, 1953, he was still arguably MGM's hottest act by summer; two albums were in stores by March, Memorial Album and Hank Williams as Luke the Drifter, and within ten weeks of his death he had as many albums on the market as he did when he lived, with hundreds more to follow.  As biographer Colin Escott observes, "Hank's entire catalog began moving in unprecedented quantities...The oil well that Hank Williams became in death started to gush." Like Elvis Presley over two decades later, Williams became even larger in death than he had been in life, and MGM capitalized on his growing legend by exploiting the LP market and issuing its remaining Williams recordings as singles.

"Weary Blues from Waiting" had likely been recorded as a demo some time in 1951. The Drifting Cowboys, most of them now working for Ray Price, were brought back to augment the recording with overdubs.  While MGM would insensitively overdub strings and other accoutrements to Williams masters as the years wore on, the results on "Weary Blues from Waitin'" were utterly convincing, and the single rose to number 7 on the country singles chart.  A major part of the song's success was Williams' typically heart-rendering vocal and the high quality of the composition, which contains what is cited as one of his most haunting lines:

Although the song is copyrighted to Williams alone, it is likely that Ray Price had a hand in writing it, during a car ride from Williams's Opry performance, to a show in Evansville, Indiana in September 1951 (Price also recorded the song in a month later).  The song was eventually released in its original, undubbed form.

Cover versions
Ronnie Hawkins recorded a version for Roulette in 1960.
Bob Dylan and Joan Baez recorded in 1965, released in The Bootleg Series Vol.12 Collector's Edition
Del Shannon covered the song in 1964.
Spike Jones recorded the song in 1964.
Wanda Jackson released a version in 1964.
Duane Eddy recorded an instrumental version for RCA.
Buddy Greco recorded it for Epic in 1965.
Hank Williams, Jr. cut the song for MGM in 1966.
Steve Goodman recorded the song for his 1977 album Say It in Private''.
Vince Martin & Fred Neil recorded a version for their only album "Tear Down the Walls."
The The covered the song in 1995 album Hanky Panky
Madeleine Peyroux recorded a version for her 2004 album "Carelesslove" "

Discography

References

Hank Williams songs
1951 songs
1953 singles
Songs written by Hank Williams
MGM Records singles